The Microphysidae are a very small family of bugs, comprising only 5 extant genera.

Systematics

Until recently, many authors considered these bugs to belong within the family Anthocoridae.

The following genera belong to this family:

Subfamily Microphysinae
 Genus Chinaola Blatchley
 Genus Loricula Curtis (= Microphysa)
 Genus Mallochiola Bergroth
 Genus Myrmedobia Bärensprung
 Genus †Myrmericula Popov
 Genus †Popovophysa McKellar & Engel 2011, Canadian amber, Campanian
 Genus †Tytthophysa Popov & Herczek 2009 Baltic amber, Eocene
Subfamily Ciorullinae

 Genus Ciorulla Péricart

 
Cimicomorpha
Heteroptera families